Louis Compain (14 April 1733, Toury – after 1790), also known as Compain-Despierrières, was a French actor and singer. He is notable as the co-director of the Théâtre de la Monnaie in Brussels from 1772 to 1776, where he had made his debut in 1757. He also acted in the Du Londel Troupe in Sweden, at Marseille (1759), Bordeaux (1760), The Hague (1768), Metz (1778), Toulouse (1779), Nîmes (1786) and Nantes (1790).

References 

 Jacques Isnardon, Vitzthumb et Compain Despierrières, in Le théatre de la Monnaie depuis sa fondation jusqu'à nos jours, Schott Frères, Brussel, 1890.

1733 births
1790 deaths
Actors of the Austrian Netherlands
People from Eure-et-Loir
French male singers
French male stage actors
Directors of La Monnaie
18th-century French male actors